Uxbridge is a town in the London Borough of Hillingdon. There is a road called Uxbridge Road in London too.

Uxbridge may also refer to:

Places
RAF Uxbridge, a UK Air Force base
Uxbridge, Massachusetts, United States
Uxbridge, Ontario, Canada
 Uxbridge Road in Howick, New Zealand and a railroad station on the former Kurow Branch rail line
Uxbridge Township, North Dakota, United States
Uxbridge, Tasmania, a Postal code zone in Tasmania, Australia

Other
 Earl of Uxbridge, a subsidiary title held by the Marquess of Anglesey, formerly a title in its own right
 Uxbridge Art Gallery, an art gallery in New Zealand
 Uxbridge and South Ruislip (UK Parliament constituency)

See also

 Uxbridge station (disambiguation)

Oxbridge (disambiguation)